Macrosoma paularia is a moth-like butterfly in the family Hedylidae. It was described by William Schaus in 1901.

References

Hedylidae
Butterflies described in 1901